The Bologna–Ancona railway is an Italian railway that connects the city of Bologna with the city of Ancona, passing through the Po Valley to Rimini and along the Adriatic coast for the rest of the line.

History
The concession to build and operate the railway between Ancona and Bologna was granted by the government of the Papal States, under a decree of 21 May 1856 to the Marquis of Casa Valdes, with a prescription to build it within 10 years and for a duration of 95 years. On the following 16 August, the government approved a statute founding the Società generale delle strade ferrate romane (Roman Railways Company), which was established for the construction and operation of the Ancona–Orte railway and its extension to Bologna. This company was the concessionaire of the entire network called the Pio Centrale ("Central Pius" in honour of Pope Pius IX), which also included the Romaę–Civitavecchia railway. It would also support the Austrian Lombardy–Venetia railways network by extending a railway to Ferrara and the Po.

The railway was opened for operations in 1861, when the territories were annexed to the Kingdom of Italy. The Bologna–Forlì section was opened on 1 September 1861, the Forlì–Rimini section on 5 October and section to Ancona station on 17 November. The opening ceremony for the whole line had been held seven days earlier.
 
This line, along with others belonging to Pio Centrale itself, were assigned to the Società per le strade ferrate romane (Roman Railways Company) established following the reorganisation of the railways authorised by the law of 14 May 1865, no 2279. As a result of the Roman Railways' poor financial condition, which worsened after the 1870s, the management of the line finally passed to the Società Italiana per le strade ferrate meridionali (Company for the Southern Railways), which retained it following the "conventions" of 1885. After 1905, following the enactment of the "Fortis" law, which nationalised the railways, the management passed to Ferrovie dello Stato.
 
The line was doubled in the early twentieth century. Electrification at 3000 V DC was inaugurated on 12 November 1938 and went into operation two days later.

Features 
The line is a double-track line entirely electrified at 3000 volts DC. The management of the infrastructure is carried out by the Rete Ferroviaria Italiana.
 
It is equipped with the Sistema Controllo Marcia Treno train-control system, centralised traffic control (Bologna Centrale–Castelbolognese Riolo Terme) and Sistema di Comando e Controllo (Castelbolognese Riolo Terme-Ancona Marittima) (another form of centralised traffic control).
 
Operated by the central operations managers based in Bologna Centrale (Bologna Centrale–Rimini) and at Bari Lamasinata (Rimini–Ancona Marittima), it uses the RS4 Codici train protection system allowing maximum speeds between 115 and 200 km/h.
 
Since 2015, the line has been undergoing major infrastructure upgrading works, allowing the maximum speed of the line to be raised to 200 km/h.

Route
 
It continues for a short distance parallel to the A14 and then reaches ; from here to Savignano sul Rubicone the line follows a straight line and for the most part parallel to state road 9 (Via Emilia), passing through the towns of Ozzano dell'Emilia, Castel San Pietro Terme, Imola, Castel Bolognese, Faenza, Forlì, Forlimpopoli, Cesena and Gambettola.
 
After passing the municipality of Savignano sul Rubicone, the line bends slightly to the south-east and continues to the town of Santarcangelo di Romagna, then continuing in a straight line with a west–east course and then bends in parallel to the Adriatic coast, finally reaching Rimini.
 
The line continues from the latter to Cattolica and follows a course parallel to the coast, touching the towns of Riccione and Misano Adriatico and then joins first, in the locality of Gabicce Mare, the A14 and then, near Pesaro, state road 16 (Adriatica).
 
From the city of Pesaro, the line continues its route next to state road 16 through the towns of Fano, Marotta, Senigallia, Marzocca, Marina di Montemarciano and Falconara Marittima.
 
From the latter, the railway continues its route alongside the historical route of state road 16 thus reaching the city of Ancona, with a branch to its port.
 
 
Throughout its journey, the railway crosses numerous railways and tramways, some still in use, some disused and others never completed.
 
Until 1944, it crossed the Massalombarda–Imola–Fontanelice railway in Romagna, near Imola. In Castel Bolognese, it connected with the  line to Riolo Bagni, closed in 1933, and shortly later is still connects with the line to Ravenna. In Faenza, the lines connects with two railways of regional interest: Florence–Faenza, called the Faentina, and Faenza–Ravenna. In the locality of Santarcangelo di Romagna, the  Baccarini law (law of  29 July 1879, no. 5002, for the construction of new lines to complete the rail network) provided for a connection, never completed, with Urbino and therefore with the Ancona–Orte railway, the so-called Ferrovia Subappennina (Sub-Apennine railway). Finally, it merges near Rimini station with the line to Ravenna and, until 1944, with the Rimini–San Marino railway. The Rimini–Novafeltria railway ended in the square in front of the station until 1960.
 
In the Marche, the railway has two junctions: the first near Fano with the line to Fermignano and Urbino, closed to traffic in 1987, and the second near Falconara Marittima with the line to Rome.

Traffic 
There are both regional passenger trains and long-distance trains on the line. These trains are operated by Trenitalia and Trenitalia Tper; the latter also operates the Freccia Orobica (Bergamo–Pesaro).

Its main train services are:

Regional Trains Piacenza-Parma-Reggio Emilia-Modena-Bologna Centrale-Imola-Castel Bolognese-Faenza-Forlì-Cesena-Rimini-Riccione-Cattolica-Pesaro-Fano-Falconara Marittima-Ancona (sometimes, these train services start from Milan Centrale and continue to Pescara during the summer month. There is also a daily service from Ravenna and Rimini to Genoa Brignole)
Regional Trains Bologna Centrale-Imola-Castel Bolognese-Lugo-Russi-Ravenna-Cervia-Cesenatico-Rimini
Freccia Orobica regional trains Bergamo-Brescia-Cremona-Mantova-Suzzara-Ferrara-Ravenna-Cervia-Cesenatico-Rimini-Riccione-Cattolica-Pesaro (summer only)
Intercity and Intercity Night Trains Turin Porta Nuova-Milan Centrale-Lodi-Piacenza-Parma-Reggio Emilia-Modena-Bologna-Faenza-Forli-Cesena-Rimini-Riccione-Pesaro-Fano-Senigallia-Ancona-Civitanova Marche-San Benedetto del Tronto-Pescara-Termoli-Foggia-Bari-Taranto/Brindisi-Lecce (these trains call in the summer season also in Cattolica-San Giovanni-Gabicce and, in the occasion of MotoGP and Superbike races, at Misano Adriatico)
Frecciabianca High-Speed Trains 
Turin Porta Nuova-Milan Centrale-Lodi-Piacenza-Parma-Reggio Emilia-Modena-Venice Santa Lucia-Venice Mestre-Padova-Rovigo-Ferrara-Bologna-Faenza-Forli-Cesena-Rimini-Riccione-Pesaro-Fano-Senigallia-Ancona-Civitanova Marche-San Benedetto del Tronto-Pescara-Termoli-Foggia-Bari-Taranto/Brindisi-Lecce (Most Frecciabianca services have now been replaced by Frecciargento high-speed trains)
Frecciarossa High-Speed Trains Milan Centrale-Reggio Emilia-Bologna Centrale-Forlì-Rimini-Pesaro-Ancona-Pescara-Termoli-Foggia-Bari-Brindisi-Lecce
EuroCity Trains Munich HBF-Rosenheim-Kufstein-Innsbruck-Brenner/Brennero-Brixen/Bressanone-Bozen/Bolzano-Trento-Rovereto-Verona Porta Nuova-Bologna Centrale-Cesena-Rimini (summer only, in the winter season, these trains terminate in Bologna)

See also 
 List of railway lines in Italy

References

Notes

Footnotes

Sources
 }
 
 
 }

Railway lines in Emilia-Romagna
Railway lines in the Marche
Railway lines opened in 1861
1861 establishments in Italy